These are the results from the synchronised swimming competition at the 1986 World Aquatics Championships.

Medal table

Medal summary

References
https://www.fina.org/sites/default/files/histofina_sy_final_2_0.pdf

 
1986 in synchronized swimming
Synchronised swimming
Synchronised swimming at the World Aquatics Championships
Synchronised swimming in Spain